The 1944 Mississippi State Maroons football team represented Mississippi State College during the 1944 college football season. The Maroons returned to action after not playing in 1943 due to World War II. Halfback Shorty McWilliams was named the SEC Player of the Year by the Nashville Banner.

Schedule

References

Mississippi State
Mississippi State Bulldogs football seasons
Mississippi State Maroons football